Ahmed Yusuf Yasin (born  1957) is a Somaliland politician and lawyer who was Vice President of Somaliland, from 2002 until 2010 and he was the second chairman of UDUB party. He hails from the Issa Musa (Adan Issa) sub-division of the Habr Awal Isaaq clan. He was appointed as Vice President in 2002.

References 

1957 births
Living people
Vice presidents of Somaliland
Somaliland politicians
People from Hargeisa
Issa Musa